Migration is the third studio album by The Amboy Dukes.
It was released in 1969 on Mainstream Records (stereo S/6118).
On this album, Rusty Day replaced John Drake on vocals and guitarist Ted Nugent, for the first time, took lead vocals on select tracks.
The song "I'm Not a Juvenile Delinquent" is a cover of the 1956 song by Frankie Lymon and The Teenagers.

A CD reissue was released in 1991 by Repertoire Records with two bonus tracks (REP 4178-WZ).
It credits the band as "The American Amboy Dukes", the name under which the group's records were released in Britain.
This CD features an edited version of 'Prodigal Man' (bass and organ solo removed - 5:48) and not the full version from the original LP.
(In fact, the full version has yet to see a CD release.) There are 2 LP versions of 'Prodigal Man' digitally released. The original LP version (9:09) - drum solo, bass solo, organ solo and guitar solo and a new arrangement (8:51) - organ solo, drum solo, bass solo and guitar solo. New arrangement is included with the extended editions of Journey to the Center of the Mind.

Track listing

Personnel
Rusty Day – lead vocals, percussion
Ted Nugent – lead vocals, lead guitar, percussion
Steve Farmer – rhythm guitar, vocals, strings
Andy Solomon – keyboards, vocals, horns, percussion, strings
Greg Arama – bass, bass vocals, percussion
Dave Palmer – drums, percussion

References 

1969 albums
The Amboy Dukes albums
Mainstream Records albums
Repertoire Records albums